Olga Strashun Weil (December 26, 1903 – August 5, 1963) was an American amateur tennis player and golfer in the early to mid-20th century.

Tennis
At the tennis tournament in Cincinnati, Strashun Weil won the singles title in 1924 and was a singles finalist in 1922 and 1926. She also paired with Clara Louise Zinke to win the doubles title in 1927.

She won the 1924 Ohio State singles championships, and at the 1922 Ohio State championships she was the singles runner-up and won the mixed doubles title with Louis Kuhler.

She also paired with Zinke to reach the doubles final of the 1927 Western Tennis Championship.

In the Ohio State Championships, she won one singles title (1924), reached another singles final (1922), and won two mixed doubles titles (in 1923 and 1924), both with Louis Kuhler.
	
Strashun Weil was ranked No. 1 in doubles and No. 4 in singles in the United States Tennis Association's Western Section in 1926.

Golf
Strashun Weil won her third Ohio Amateur golf title in 1936. She also was a finalist in the 1941 Women's Western Open (falling to Patty Berg in match play competition in the final match, 7 and 6).

University of Cincinnati
Strashun Weil attended the University of Cincinnati where she played tennis and captained the basketball team. She has been elected to that school's Athletic Hall of Fame and was the "C-Ring Award" recipient for 1924 (presented annually to a top female athlete at that school).

Personal life
Strashun Weil was the daughter of Aaron Strashun, MD, and Amanda Frank Strashun of Cincinnati. She and her husband, Burt Weil, lived at one point in the North Avondale section of Cincinnati.

Sources
From Club Court to Center Court by Phillip S. Smith (2008 Edition)
The American Israelite, July 20, 2011
St. Petersburg Times - Saturday, June 14, 1941, Page 11

American female tennis players
Tennis players from Cincinnati
American female golfers
Amateur golfers
Golfers from Ohio
Cincinnati Bearcats women's basketball players
1903 births
1963 deaths
20th-century American women